The Knoller C.II was a reconnaissance aircraft built in Austria-Hungary during World War I for use by the Austro-Hungarian army.

Design and development
The C.II was a conventional biplane design with staggered wings, and seated the pilot and observer in tandem in an open cockpit. Like Knoller's preceding C.I design, the upper wing was swept back, but not as far as it had been on the earlier aircraft. The structure was wooden throughout, with the wings skinned in fabric and the fuselage in plywood. The interplane struts were made of steel and arranged in a warren truss configuration.

Initial production was undertaken in three batches of 24 aircraft, one each by Aviatik, Lohner, and WKF, with the first machine delivered to the Army in September 1916. On 10 February the following year, the wings of this aircraft collapsed in flight and its crew was killed in the ensuing crash, leading to production and further flying of the type to be suspended. A single example is preserved at the National Technical Museum in Prague.

Operational history
Relatively few Knoller C.II aircraft were issued to front-line units, with almost unanimous criticism of the strength, build quality and flying characteristics. Although all the contracted aircraft were built, many were stored un-assembled, due to the advent of other types with superior performance and flying qualities.

Variants
C.II(Av) series 36 Knoller C.II production, powered by  Austro-Daimler 185hp 6-cyl. engines, at Aviatik -Österreichish-Ungarische Flugzeugfabrik Aviatik - 24 built.
C.II(Av) series 136 Knoller C.II production, powered by  Austro-Daimler 160hp 6-cyl. engines, at Aviatik -Österreichish-Ungarische Flugzeugfabrik Aviatik - 24 contracted all stored un-assembled.
C.II(Lo) series 19 Knoller C.II production, powered by  Austro-Daimler 185hp 6-cyl. engines, at Lohner - Lohnerwerke GmbH, 16 built.
C.II(Lo) series 119 Knoller C.II production, powered by  Austro-Daimler 160hp 6-cyl. engines, at Lohner - Lohnerwerke GmbH, 32 built.
C.II(WKF) series 81 Knoller C.II production, powered by  Austro-Daimler 160hp 6-cyl. engines, at WKF - Wiener Karosserie und Flugzeugfabrik, 24 built.

Operators

Austro-Hungarian Imperial and Royal Aviation Troops
Flik 66/D (81.01, 81.02 and 81.04)
Flik 67/D (81.03 and 81.05)
Flek 1, 5, 8, and 18 (series 81)
Airmail flight at Aspern (81.11 and 81.23 with 4 hour fuel tank)
Flik 70 (36.08, 36.10, 36.11, 36.14 and 36.20)
Flek 5 (series 36)
Flik 50
Flieger-Versuchsabteilung Stryj

Hungarian Air Force
Hungarian 5th Air Squadron (9x series 119)

Specifications (C.II(Av) series 36)

References

Further reading

External links

 National Technical Museum in Prague page on Knoller C.II (in Czech)

Knoller aircraft
1910s Austro-Hungarian military reconnaissance aircraft
Biplanes
Single-engined tractor aircraft
Aircraft first flown in 1916